The Militant Socialist Movement (abbreviated MSM) is a centre-left political party in Mauritius. It is the largest single political party in the National Assembly of Mauritius, winning 42 of the 69 seats in the 2019 general elections. It also holds the largest number of seats in all city/town councils through the country with 60 councilors out of 120.

The MSM is one of the three biggest political parties in the country, the others being the Labour Party (PTR) and Mouvement Militant Mauricien (MMM).

The MSM has won, either alone or as part of a coalition, six of the twelve general elections in Mauritius since independence (in 1983, 1987, 1991, 2000, 2014 and 2019). It draws most of its support from the country's Hindu majority.

The MSM was founded in 1983 by Sir Anerood Jugnauth, who was Prime Minister three times, for a total of sixteen years (1982–1995, 2000–2003, and again since 2014). He was also President from 2003 to 2012. He led the MSM from 1983 to 2003, when his son Pravind Jugnauth, officially assumed the leadership. Pravind Jugnauth served as Vice Prime Minister in his father's cabinet. Other members of the Jugnauth family have also been politically active, including Lall Jugnauth (a former Attorney General), Ashok Jugnauth (former Minister of Health) and Maya Hanoomanjee (also former Minister of Health).

As of 2021, the front bench of the MSM is composed of four members, namely Pravind Jugnauth (Leader), Maneesh Gobin (Secretary General), Joe Lesjongard (President), and Leela Devi Dookhun (Vice President).

Party history
The Militant Socialist Movement emerged in 1983 out of the split between the leaders of the two main parties comprising the coalition government: the MMM founder Paul Bérenger and the Parti Socialiste Mauricien (PSM) leader, Harish Boodhoo. Bérenger proposed a constitutional amendment to transfer the executive powers of the Prime Minister to the Cabinet as a collective body. Prime Minister Jugnauth, a member of the MMM, rejected Bérenger's proposal and was supported by Boodhoo. Bérenger sought a parliamentary vote of no confidence to replace Jugnauth with Prem Nababsing, but Jugnauth abruptly dissolved the National Assembly before it had a chance to vote. The MMM split, with Jugnauth and his supporters merging with Boodhoo's PSM to form the MSM. The MSM, in an electoral pact with the Labour Party and the PMSD, went on to win the ensuring election and Jugnauth remained in office. In 1985, four members of the MSM were arrested in  the Netherlands and charged with smuggling heroin. The MSM won the 1987 election with the same partners, and the 1991 election in a coalition with the MMM.

The coalition with the MMM turned out to be only a temporary rapprochement. In the leadup to the election expected to be held in 1996, the MMM left the government and formed an alliance with the Labour Party.  Several MSM Members of Parliament also defected to the opposition, putting the Jugnauth administration under increasing strain. The elections ended up being brought forward to 1995. The opposition Labour-MMM coalition won all 60 seats, leaving the MSM without parliamentary representation. Navin Ramgoolam of the Labour Party became Prime Minister.

The Labour-MMM coalition subsequently broke up, and for the 2000 election, the MMM agreed to a pact with the MSM, providing that Jugnauth would serve as Prime Minister for three years. He would then resign and assume the presidency, handing the office of Prime Minister over to Paul Bérenger, the MMM leader. The MSM/MMM alliance won 54 of the 60 seats, and, as per the agreement, Jugnauth became Prime Minister and was succeeded by Bérenger in 2003. Bérenger led this coalition, which now included the PMSD, to defeat in the 2005 elections, however, and Ramgoolam became Prime Minister again.  In 2010, the MSM joined the Labour-led Alliance de L'Avenir, which won the election, and Ramgoolam remained Prime Minister, with Pravind Jugnauth of the MSM as his Deputy.

By 2014, politics had realigned yet again. The MSM left the government to oppose the Labor Party, which now joined forces with the MMM instead. The MSM contested that year's election as part of the Alliance Lepep, which also included the PMSD and the Muvman Liberater; the alliance won 47 of the 60 directly elected mainland seats. Jugnauth, now 84, became Prime Minister again, even though his son Pravind Jugnauth was officially the party leader.  In January 2017, Prime Minister Anerood Jugnauth stepped down to hand power to his son, Pravind. In November 2019, Mauritius’ ruling Militant Socialist Movement (MSM) won more than half of the seats in the 2019 elections, securing incumbent Prime Minister Pravind Kumar Jugnauth a new five-year term.

Alliance LEPEP (2014–present)
The MSM allied itself with two parties, the Parti Mauricien Social Démocrate (PMSD) and the Muvman Liberater (ML) which won another 18 seats, giving the MSM-led Alliance Lepep a clear majority of 51 seats in the 70-member parliament . It also hold 17 of the 25 positions in the Cabinet.

Electoral history
Each party put the a number of candidates for each general elections. There are 60 Mauritian constituency seats directly elected plus 10 that is combination of Rodrigues seats (2) and best losers(8) to ensure equal ethnic representation.

See also
:Category:Militant Socialist Movement politicians

Notes

References

External links 
 Official Website

Political parties in Mauritius
Socialist parties in Mauritius
Political parties established in 1983
Main
Social democratic parties in Africa